Danny Dignum (born 17 March 1992) is an English professional boxer who has held the WBO European middleweight title since 2019. As an amateur he won a bronze medal at the 2013 World Combat Games.

Early life 
Danny Dignum was born on 17 March 1992 in Essex, England. He attended St. Margaret's primary school in his home town of Bowers Gifford before attending The Appleton School in South Benfleet. He worked alongside his dad and twin brother as a tarmacer and concreter before taking up boxing full time. After his parents became fed up of he and his twin brother fighting, both began boxing at the age of nine on their father's suggestion.

Amateur career
During a career in which he had around 85 fights with approximately 70 wins, he won the 2012 ABA Championships, a bronze medal at the 2013 World Combat Games and competed at the 2014 European Union Championships as part of the GB Boxing team.

Professional career
Dignum made his professional debut on 26 November 2016, scoring a second-round technical knockout (TKO) victory over Jimmy White at the Wembley Arena in London.

After compiling a record of 11–0 (5 KOs) he faced Conrad Cummings for the vacant WBO European middleweight title on 9 November 2019 at the York Hall in London. In a fight which saw Cummings receive a point deduction in the second round for repeated use of his elbow and suffer a cut in the fourth from an accidental head clash, Dignum captured the WBO European title via fifth-round TKO after referee Howard Foster stopped the contest to save Cummings from further punishment. He successfully defended the title four months later on 7 March 2020, defeating Alfredo Meli via ninth-round TKO at the Brentwood Centre in Brentwood, Essex. Dignum dropped Meli three times with punches to the body – once in the seventh, again in the eighth and for the final time in the ninth – prompting Meli's corner to throw in the towel as the referee called a halt to the contest.

Professional boxing record

References

Living people
1992 births
English male boxers
Middleweight boxers
Southpaw boxers
Sportspeople from Essex
English twins